The Tunnel of Love (Tunel Kokhannya) is a section of industrial railway located near Klevan, Ukraine, that links it with Orzhiv. It is a railway surrounded by green arches and is three to five kilometers in length. It is known for being a favorite place for couples to take walks since trains pass thrice a day.

Route
The line starts at Klevan station, on the Kovel-Rivne line, and reaches a fibreboard factory in the northern area of Orzhiv, also served by a station on the main line. The whole line is about 6.4 km long., and about 4.9 km is covered by forest, within which this tunnel stretches anywhere from 3 to said 4.9 km, depending on how individuals measure it.

Gallery

Notes

References

Literature

External links

Reportage: In the Tunnel of Love (June 2017)
10 Most Fascinating Tunnels - ODDEE
Tunnel of Love in Ukraine at placestoseeinyourlifetime.com

Landmarks in Ukraine
Tourist attractions in Rivne Oblast
Railroad attractions
Railway lines in Ukraine
Passenger rail transport in Ukraine